Louis L. "Lou" Kafka (born November 28, 1945 in Boston, Massachusetts) is an American former politician. He represented the 8th Norfolk District in the Massachusetts House of Representatives from 1991 to 2021.

On September 1, 2020, Kafka's staff director, Ted Philips, won the Democratic primary over Andrew Flowers to succeed him in the Massachusetts House of Representatives. On Tuesday, November 3, 2020, Philips won the Norfolk 8th District general election unopposed. He assumed office on January 6, 2021.

See also
 2019–2020 Massachusetts legislature
1991–1992 Massachusetts legislature

References

1945 births
People from Stoughton, Massachusetts
University of Miami alumni
New England Law Boston alumni
Living people
Democratic Party members of the Massachusetts House of Representatives
Politicians from Boston
21st-century American politicians